Højt paa en kvist is a 1929 Danish silent family film directed by Lau Lauritzen Sr. and written by his son Lau Lauritzen Jr.

Cast
Carl Schenstrøm as Fyrtårnet 
Harald Madsen as  Bivognen 
Victor Wulff   
Gerda Kofoed   
Marguerite Viby   
Nina Kalckar   
Bruno Tyron   
Emmy Schønfeld   
Mathilde Felumb-Friis   
Alex Suhr   
Christian Arhoff   
Emil Hass Christensen

External links

1929 films
Danish silent films
1920s adventure comedy films
Danish black-and-white films
Films directed by Lau Lauritzen Sr.
Buddy comedy films
Danish adventure comedy films
1929 comedy films